The World Association for Public Opinion Research (WAPOR) is an international professional association of researchers in the field of survey research. It is a member organization of the International Science Council.

History 
Established in 1947 at the Second International Conference on Public Opinion Research held in Williamstown, Massachusetts
as the World Congress on Public Opinion Research, the association acquired its current name in 1948, at the Third International Conference on Public Opinion Research.
In 1953, it became the sole nongovernment consultant organization to UNESCO in the field of polling.

Its current president is Timothy P. Johnson (University of Illinois Chicago) and the vice president is Robert Chung (Hong Kong Public Opinion Research Institute, in Hong Kong).
Among the former presidents of WAPOR are Juan Linz, Elisabeth Noelle-Neumann, Robert Worcester and Seymour Martin Lipset.

Membership 
Over time, WAPOR's membership has grown and become more international. In 1956, roughly a decade after its founding, the association had 158 members from about 20 countries; by 1962, these figures had risen to approximately 200 and more than 30, respectively.
In 1970, WAPOR had more than 300 members from 41 countries.

As of 2021, the association has approximately 500 members from research institutes and universities in over 60 countries on six continents.

Activities 
WAPOR sponsors the International Journal of Public Opinion Research, a social science journal published by Oxford University Press.

Annual conference are held in a three-year cycle: with American Association for Public Opinion Research (AAPOR) in North America (Toronto 2019), in connection with either European Society for Opinion and Marketing Research (ESOMAR) or ESRA in Europe (Lisbon 2017), and in the third year somewhere else (Morocco 2018). This arrangement permits WAPOR members to meet with academic, commercial, and government researchers from the main centers of survey research around the globe. Our most recent annual conferences were held virtually due to the pandemic in 2020 and during the dates of November 2–6, 2021. AAPOR and ESOMAR are considered "allied associations."

Since 1981, WAPOR offers the Helen Dinerman Award – created to honour sociologist Helen Dinerman – to individuals who have made "significant contributions to survey research methodology".
Prior recipients include social scientists Philip Converse, Louis Guttman,
Roger Jowell,
Elihu Katz,
Juan Linz, Seymour Martin Lipset,
Robert K. Merton,
Elisabeth Noelle-Neumann,
Sidney Verba,
Robert Worcester, and Daniel Yankelovich.

Influence 
Richard Morin, former polling director of The Washington Post, described WAPOR as "the leading professional association of pollsters working outside the United States".
Herbert Weisberg, a political scientist at Ohio State University and former president of the Midwest Political Science Association,
further credited WAPOR with contributing to the internationalization, and thereby the professionalization, of the field of survey research.

See also 
 Opinion poll
 Public opinion

References

External links 
 Official website of WAPOR
 International Journal of Public Opinion Research

Organizations established in 1947
International organizations based in the United States
Professional associations based in the United States
Public opinion research companies
Social sciences organizations
Survey methodology
1947 establishments in Massachusetts
Members of the International Science Council